WMPF-LP (91.1 FM) is a radio station licensed to serve the community of Rumford, Maine. The station is owned by the River Valley Community Association and airs a variety format.

The station was assigned the WMPF-LP call letters by the Federal Communications Commission on January 22, 2014.

References

External links
 Official Website
 

MPF-LP
MPF-LP
Radio stations established in 2016
2016 establishments in Maine
Variety radio stations in the United States
Oxford County, Maine
Rumford, Maine